The 2023 WCHA Ice Hockey Tournament was the 24th edition of the WCHA Tournament. It was played between February 24 and March 4, 2023. It was hosted by the University of Minnesota at Ridder Arena. Minnesota won the championship over Ohio State, 3-1, making it their 8th title. Minnesota received the conference's automatic bid into the 2023 NCAA National Collegiate women's ice hockey tournament.

Format 
The tournament included all eight teams in the conference. Teams were ranked according to their finish in the conference standings. All quarterfinal games were best two of three and were played at the highest seeds home sites, and starting with the semifinals, single-elimination played at Ridder Arena. The tournament champion will receive an automatic bid into the 2023 NCAA National Collegiate women's ice hockey tournament.

Standings

Bracket 

Note: * denotes overtime period(s)

Results

Quarterfinals

(8) Bemidji State at (1) Ohio State

(7) St. Thomas at (2) Minnesota

(6) Minnesota State at (3) Wisconsin

(5) St. Cloud State at (4) Minnesota-Duluth

Semifinals

(4) Minnesota-Duluth vs. (1) Ohio State

(3) Wisconsin vs. (2) Minnesota

Championship

(2) Minnesota vs. (1) Ohio State

Tournament Awards

All-Tournament Team 
F: Abbey Murphy* (Minnesota)
F: Peyton Hemp (Minnesota)
F: Taylor Heise (Minnesota)
D: Madeline Wethington (Minnesota)
D: Sophie Jaques (Ohio State)
G: Skylar Vetter (Minnesota)
* Most Outstanding Player

References 

College sports tournaments in Minnesota
College sports tournaments in Ohio
College sports tournaments in Wisconsin
Ice hockey competitions in Minneapolis
WCHA Ice Hockey Tournament
WCHA Ice Hockey Tournament
WCHA Ice Hockey Tournament
Ice hockey competitions in Ohio
Ice hockey competitions in Wisconsin